Music Traveler is a peer-to-peer sharing economy platform specialised in the centralisation of venues and spaces for members of the creative sector. This is achieved through the rental of music studios, practice rooms and recital spaces. However, other services are also provided including the rental of concert halls, live music venues, rooms for music lessons, festival locations, outdoor music venues, theatres, and the company is involved in collaborations with the educational sector. The company was founded in Vienna, Austria in 2017 by Aleksey Igudesman and Julia Rhee. The Music Traveler mobile application has been available for use since 2018. Co-founders Igudesman and Rhee are both recognised musicians.

The service is intended for use by professional musicians on concert tours and amateur musicians who want to practice and has gained the backing of prominent supporters such as John Malkovich, Billy Joel and Hans Zimmer. The latter are also members of Music Traveler's advisory board that also includes pianist Emmanuel Ax, pianist Yuja Wang, and director of the Vienna Philharmonic Clemens Hellsberg. Steinway Austria is one of the company's partners.

The primary aim of the service is to create a centralised way of providing spaces for musicians in need of them and enabling other musicians to rent out their own premises; these could also at the renters' request be furnished with instruments, and co-founders have already announced their plans to collaborate with music schools on a worldwide scale. According to a conference in the Vienna Konzerthaus on 2 October 2017, Vienna is home to 250,000 musicians who require 700,000 hours of practice annually and 400,000 households that have at least one instrument.

In 2017, Music Traveler was chosen by the Vienna Business Agency to represent the Austrian startup scene on the SXSW festival in Austin, Texas. 

At the start of 2020, a partnership was announced between Music Traveler and FanDragon Technologies, a platform that specialises in online ticketing, who announced their plan to integrate their SaaS technology into Music Traveler's mobile app through SDK integration.

On 24 March 2020, the Music Traveler team appeared on the seventh season of the German investment television show Die Höhle der Löwen.

In response to the COVID-19 crisis the company has launched a new feature called Music from Home

Music Traveler + 
Music Traveler + is a project  developed by the Music Traveler team (Aleksey Igudesman, Julia Rhee, Dominik Joelsohn). The aim of the project is to support members of the music industry who have suffered losses due to the COVID-19 crisis. It will permit musicians to stream concerts online and charge viewers tickets for their virtual concerts. It will also enable online lessons for music schools and teachers. Streams will all be conducted on the Music Traveler platform and an integrated ticketing system would enable the direct creation of revenue.

The project has received the support of several musicians including pianist Hyung-ki Joo, pianist Gabriela Montero, violinist Julian Rachlin and violist Antoine Tamestit.

References 

Austrian companies established in 2017